The 1999 Italy rugby union tour of South Africa was a series of matches played in June 1999 in South Africa by Italy national rugby union team, to prepare the 1999 Rugby World Cup
It was an infamous tour, and after that, the Coach of "Azzurri" , Georges Coste, that only one year before led the team to his best results in the story, was fired.

Results 
Scores and results list Italy's points tally first.

References
 
 

Italy
tour
Italy national rugby union team tours
tour
Rugby union tours of South Africa